3803 KM is the designation of a free-standing lattice tower used for broadcasting purposes, which was built in over 80 towns of former Soviet Union from 1955 to 1972 and used for FM- and TV-broadcasting. Towers of this type, which was developed by the Soviet Institute for Steel Construction, are 4-side freestanding truss towers which make use of tubular steel columns for their main supports beams and can be differentiated from more recent towers of a similar profile by this unique feature. Most newer Russian designs along with their North American and European counterparts typical make use of L or T-beams instead. Another distinct feature of these towers is that they gradually taper wider towards the base at the same preset intervals. They are also nearly universally identical in height, with a few exceptions these towers are 180 meters tall to the top of the steel framework. Most of which are topped with broadcast antennas that adds some additional height and they have platforms at the 140 and 148 metres level for more antennas. Some 3803 KM only have a signal upper platform, but are otherwise identical in design.

Most of these towers are still in use today more than half a century after construction and are often the characteristic landmarks and tallest structure in the towns they reside in.

List of 3803 KM radio towers
 indicates a structure that is no longer standing.

References

External links 
 FROCUSAT :: FORUMS

Radio masts and towers
Towers built in the Soviet Union